Mademoiselle K is a four-person French rock band currently signed with EMI, as of July 2007. The band takes its name from its leader, Katerine Gierak, and so the K is for Katerine.

Career
At age four she had decided to take music as her only path when she saw a guitarist in the Bois de Boulogne in Paris. Her mother then signed her up for early music classes when she was five years old. She said in an interview that she had wanted to learn the piano, but since she and her family could not afford one and also didn't have the room for a piano, she instead learned the recorder.

At about the same time she had also started studying music including scales, rests and other music theory. In her school she had met a music teacher of the name Annick Chatreux. According to Mademoiselle K, Annick explained to her that there are no barriers between music based on genres, and that music was simply music. This advice helped Mademoiselle K to be open to all types of music including jazz, classical etc.

For her general culture exam in school, she had listened to CDs of different genres. At that time, she had also started performing live as a guitarist but not a singer. She had even started writing lyrics but she didn't set them to music straight away.

She had received her first guitar at age of 8 and she's been playing guitar ever since. She had even won a prize in classical guitar.

After she finished her secondary school, she chose musicology and started to compose her lyrics and also started to sing. At this time she was trying to qualify as a teacher. But she failed her exam and so at this time Mademoiselle K was determined to make it into music. At this time she wrote the song Ca sent l'Eté which came to be included in her first studio album Ça me Vexe.

After failing her exam, she started meeting musicians, playing for 50 Euro a night and sometimes for free. She had even started taking singing lessons and bought herself her first guitar, a Fender Telecaster. She had started writing more and more songs and put them in demos.

She was unclear at first about the combination of Rock music and French language, but seeing -M- performing during her adolescent years, she was convinced that there was nothing wrong with the combination.

She also took part in the French Kiss tour 2007 which was held in India to celebrate World Music Day. The event started on 20 June and continued for a week until 27 June. The event was spread across nine Indian cities including Chandigarh, Pune, Kolkata, New Delhi, Mumbai, Hyderabad, Chennai, Thiruvananthapuram and Bangalore. Along with her were French artists Anais Croze and Emily Loizeau.

Discography

Albums

Box albums
2011: Jamais la paix / Ça me vexe [EMI]

Live albums

Singles

References

External links
Official website 
Myspace page

French rock music groups
Musical groups from Paris